The Golden Group Memories is an American touring music group that contains former members of doo-wop groups. The 2006 line-up included:

Vito Balsamo of the Salutations
Randy Silverman of the Salutations and The Impalas
Leo Lucas of J. Frank Wilson and the Cavaliers
Jimmy Merchant of The Teenagers
Bill Goodwin of the Ink Spots
Al Handfield of Shep & the Limelights

The group was featured in the 1999 PBS special Doo Wop 50. At that time, the group was Balsamo, Silverman, Merchant, and Joe "Speedo" Frazier of The Impalas.

References

Doo-wop groups